Hornungia is a small genus of plants in the family Brassicaceae. It currently contains three species that have previously been classified as members of other genera, including Hutchinsia and Pritzelago. The genera, and sometimes several others, are usually treated as synonyms.

Species:
Hornungia alpina (syn. Hutchinsia alpina)
Hornungia petraea (syn. Hutchinsia petraea)
Hornungia procumbens (syn. Hutchinsia procumbens)

These are fleshy annuals with white flowers native to Eurasia. One species, H. procumbens, is also widespread in North America.

References

External links
Jepson Manual Treatment

Brassicaceae
Brassicaceae genera
Taxa named by Ludwig Reichenbach